Suwayd or Suwaidi may refer to:
Al Suwaidi an Arabic given name meaning "dark-coloured, black" (from أسود "black") and the singular of the Emirati tribal name Sudan.
one of the ansar (followers of Muhammad) mentioned by Al-Waqidi
a follower of Muhammad whose name is reported as "Tariq ibn Suwayd or Suwayd ibn Tariq" who received the injunction against alcohol in Sunan Abu Dawood (28.3864)
"Abu Suwayd and the Pretty Old Woman", a story in vol. 5 of 1001 Nights, see List of stories within One Thousand and One Nights
the Arabic name of Sweden

See also
Al-Suwaidi (disambiguation)
As-Suwayda